George Pitt, 1st Baron Rivers (1 May 1721 – 7 May 1803) was an English diplomat and politician.

Background and education

He was born in Geneva, the eldest son of George Pitt of Stratfieldsaye (today rendered Stratfield Saye), Hampshire, and his wife Mary Louise Bernier from Strasbourg. General Sir William Augustus Pitt was his younger brother. He was educated at Winchester, with attendance recorded in 1731, and matriculated on 26 September 1737 at Magdalen College, Oxford, being awarded an MA on 13 March 1739 and a DCL on 21 August 1745. He travelled on the continent from 1740 to 1742 and succeeded his father in 1745. He inherited Stratfield Saye House in Hampshire, making extensive alterations to the house and park.

Politics
Soon after returning from Europe, he was elected Member of Parliament at a by-election for Shaftesbury that followed the death of Charles Ewer, and sat as a Tory. He voted with the opposition during the War of the Austrian Succession against the employment of the Hanoverians. At the 1747 election, he stood for Shaftesbury, largely on his own interest, although Lord Shaftesbury endorsed him a few weeks before the poll. He also stood for the county of Dorset, a Tory stronghold, and was returned for both constituencies, choosing to sit for Dorset. In his electoral survey of c. 1749, John Perceval, 2nd Earl of Egmont, examining individuals' political support for and on behalf of Frederick, Prince of Wales, considered Pitt "not proper".

He represented Dorset continuously until 1774, becoming an independent, supporting the government from the accession of George III. Upon the formation of the Dorset Militia under the Militia Act 1757, Pitt was commissioned colonel of the regiment, and served until his resignation in 1798. In 1760, he was appointed a Groom of the Bedchamber to the King, in which office he served until 1770, when he was asked to resign to make way for Sir George Osborn, 4th Baronet, a cousin of Lord North.

Diplomacy
From 1761 to 1768, he served as Envoy-extraordinary to the Kingdom of Sardinia at Turin, although he went on leave in 1764 and never returned. In 1770 he was appointed Ambassador to Spain, but was superseded the following year.

Peerage
On 20 May 1776, he was raised to the peerage as Baron Rivers, of Stratfield Saye, Hampshire. His ancestor George Pitt (d.1694) of Stratfield Saye, had married Jane Savage, daughter of John Savage, 2nd Earl Rivers. In 1780, he was appointed Lord Lieutenant of Hampshire, but was replaced in 1782, when he became a Lord of the Bedchamber. He was appointed Lord Lieutenant of Dorset in 1793. On 16 March 1802, he obtained a new patent as Baron Rivers, of Sudeley Castle, Gloucestershire, with special remainder, in default of male issue, to his brother Sir William and his issue male, failing which to his daughter Louisa's son Horace Beckford and his issue male. He died on 7 May 1803 at Stratfield Saye and was succeeded by his only son George.

Family
On 4 January 1746, at Oxford Chapel, Marylebone, he married Penelope, daughter of Sir Henry Atkins, 4th Baronet, of Clapham, Surrey. They had four children:

George Pitt, 2nd Baron Rivers (1751–1828)
Penelope Pitt, (1749-1827) married Edward Ligonier, 1st Earl Ligonier, in 1766; divorced in 1771 and married Capt. Smith in 1784
Louisa Pitt (1754–1791), married Sir Peter Beckford (1740–1811) on 22 March 1773
Marcia Lucy Pitt (1756–1822), married James Fox-Lane in 1789

Their marriage was unhappy and they separated in 1771, living mostly in France and Italy until her death on 1 January 1795 in Milan. She was buried in the Protestant Cemetery in Livorno, Italy.

Legacy
Rivers Inlet, a fjord on the Central Coast of British Columbia, was named by Captain George Vancouver for George Pitt.

References

 
 
 
 ThePeerage.com

1721 births
1803 deaths
Alumni of Magdalen College, Oxford
Pitt, George
Pitt, George
Pitt, George
Pitt, George
Pitt, George
Barons in the Peerage of Great Britain
Peers of Great Britain created by George III
Lord-Lieutenants of Dorset
Lord-Lieutenants of Hampshire
People educated at Winchester College
Pitt, George
Ambassadors of Great Britain to Spain
British Militia officers
George
People from Stratfield Saye